Rahmanlu (also Romanized as Raḩmānlū; also known as Bandar-e-Rahmānlū and Rakhmanlu) is a village in Dizajrud-e Gharbi Rural District, in the Central District of Ajab Shir County, East Azerbaijan Province, Iran. At the 2006 census, its population was 363, in 84 families.

References 

Populated places in Ajab Shir County